Lotti may refer to any of the following:

 Antonio Lotti (c.1667–1740), Italian composer
 Brian Lotti, U.S. professional skateboarder
 Carlo Lotti (1916–2013), Italian engineer and professor of hydraulic construction
 Carola Lotti (1910–1990), Italian actress
 Cosimo Lotti (1571–1643), Italian engineer and landscape designer
 Helmut Lotti (born 1969), Belgian singer and songwriter
 Luca Lotti (born 1982), Italian politician
 Marcella Lotti della Santa (1831–1901), Italian opera singer 
 Mariella Lotti (1921–2006), Italian film actress
 Massimo Lotti (born 1969), Italian footballer
 Maurizio Lotti (1940–2014), Italian politician
 Sahara Lotti (born 1977), U.S. screenwriter and actress

See also

 Di Lotti
 Lottie (disambiguation)

Italian-language surnames